Scanlen is a surname. Notable people with the surname include:

Eliza Scanlen (born 1999), Australian actress
Thomas Charles Scanlen (1834–1912), South African politician

See also
Scanlon